Almost Family is an American drama television series based on the Australian television series Sisters, developed by Annie Weisman which aired from October 2, 2019, to February 22, 2020, on Fox.

In March 2020, Fox canceled the series after one season.

Premise
When it is revealed that fertility doctor Leon Bechley (Timothy Hutton) had used his own sperm to conceive at least 100 children throughout his career, Julia Bechley (Brittany Snow) unites with two of her half siblings—including childhood friend Edie Palmer (Megalyn Echikunwoke), and retired Olympic athlete Roxy Doyle (Emily Osment)—as they deal with issues that have been affecting their lives.

Cast

 Brittany Snow as Julia Bechley, a communications director for her father's fertility clinic
 Megalyn Echikunwoke as Edie Palmer, Julia's former friend and one of Julia's half siblings who is a criminal defense attorney
 Emily Osment as Roxy Doyle, a retired gymnast and one of Julia's half siblings
 Mo McRae as Tim Moore, Edie's husband who is also a criminal defense attorney at the same law firm and Julia's ex-boyfriend
 Mustafa Elzein as Dr. Isaac Abadi, an employee of the Bechley clinic and Leon's trusted second-in-command
 Victoria Cartagena as Amanda Doherty, the woman that Edie is cheating on her husband with and the assistant district attorney assigned to prosecute Leon
 Timothy Hutton as Leon Bechley, a fertility doctor and Julia's father, accused of fathering dozens of children without his patients' knowledge or consent

Production

Development
On October 16, 2018, it was announced that Fox had given the production, then titled Sisters, a pilot production commitment. The pilot was written by Annie Weisman who was also set to executive produce alongside Jason Katims, Jeni Mulein, Imogen Banks, Sharon Levy, Leslye Headland (also the director). Production companies involved with the pilot include Universal Television and Fox Entertainment. On February 13, 2019, the production officially received a pilot order.

On May 9, 2019, it was announced that Fox had given the series order. A few days later, it was announced that the title of the show had been changed to Not Just Me. A day after that, it was announced that the series would premiere in the fall of 2019 and air on Wednesdays at 9:00 P.M. In June 2019, Fox changed the title from Not Just Me to Almost Family. The series debuted on October 2, 2019. On March 2, 2020, the series was canceled after one season.

Casting
In February 2019, it was announced that Brittany Snow and Megalyn Echikunwoke had been cast in the pilot's lead roles. In March 2019, it was reported that Emily Osment and Victoria Cartagena had joined the cast.

Episodes

Release
On May 13, 2019, Fox released the first official trailer for the series.

Reception

Critical response
On review aggregator Rotten Tomatoes, Almost Family  holds an approval rating of 28% based on 18 reviews, with an average rating of 4.40/10. The website's critical consensus states, "An appealing cast can't make up for Almost Family appalling premise." On Metacritic, it has a weighted average score of 38 out of 100, based on 11 critics, indicating "generally unfavorable reviews".

Ratings

References

External links

2010s American drama television series
2010s American LGBT-related drama television series
2010s American medical television series
2019 American television series debuts
2020 American television series endings
2020s American drama television series
2020s American LGBT-related drama television series
2020s American medical television series
American television series based on Australian television series
Fox Broadcasting Company original programming
Pregnancy-themed television shows
Television series by Endemol
Television series by Fox Entertainment
Television series by Universal Television